Peter Francis "Frank" Carroll (December 20, 1879 – June 24, 1938) was a Canadian ice hockey player and coach. During his coaching career, his teams won at the highest levels of junior, senior and professional hockey, including two Stanley Cup championships.

Coaching career
In 1913–14, Carroll served as assistant trainer/assistant coach, alongside his trainer/coach brother Dick, with the professional National Hockey Association's Toronto Hockey Club (in media of the day, as both the Torontos and the Blueshirts), winning the  Stanley Cup. The brothers combined again to win the  Stanley Cup in the newly formed National Hockey League (NHL) with the same Toronto club, then operating under the nickname Toronto Arenas.

Carroll was then head coach of the University of Toronto Schools team in 1918–19, when it won the 1919 Memorial Cup, the inaugural junior ice hockey Memorial Cup championship. He returned to the NHL Toronto club, renamed the Toronto St. Pats, as head coach for its 1920–21 season. The St. Pats won the second half of the split season before losing in the championship playoffs against first half winner Ottawa Senators. He then coached the Toronto Granites in 1921–22, winning the 1922 Allan Cup, the senior ice hockey championship.

Death
Carroll died in an apparent suicide by drowning near Scarborough, Ontario in 1938.

Coaching record

References

External links

1879 births
1938 suicides
Canadian ice hockey coaches
Ice hockey people from Ontario
Toronto Maple Leafs coaches
Stanley Cup champions
Suicides by drowning in Canada
Suicides in Ontario
Sportspeople from Guelph